Wilson Wood may refer to:

 Wilson Wood (actor) (1915–2014), American character actor 
 Wilson Wood (footballer) (born 1943), Scottish footballer